The Norwegian Ibsen Award is awarded to promote Norwegian drama and is awarded only to playwrights.

History
The prize is awarded by Skien municipality, the hometown of author and playwright Henrik Ibsen, and has been awarded every year since 1986.
The prize is awarded to a Norwegian playwright who has published a new work in the past year which has been produced by a professional theater, radio theater, or on television. It may also be awarded for the cumulative work in authoring dramatic works.

Formerly, the prize was awarded annually in Skien on March 20th, in commemoration of the birthday of Henrik Ibsen. Since 2008 it has been awarded in September at the International Ibsen Conference held in Skien, together with the International Ibsen Award established in 2008 and first awarded to British theatre and film director Peter Brook.

Since 2005 the prize has consisted of a monetary award of 150,000 kroner and a statuette of Ibsen designed by Nina Sundbye.

The jury consists of six members, one from each of these organizations: 
 Norwegian Critics' Association
Norwegian Drama Forum 
 Norwegian Stage Instructor Association 
Norwegian Theater Directors' Association
 Oslo National Academy of the Arts/University of Oslo
 Skien municipality with Theatre Ibsen

The responsibility for public relations is handled by the firm Kulturmeglerne.

Prizewinners 
 1986 – Arne Skouen for overall dramatic contributions 
 1987 – Peder Cappelen for 
 1988 – Odd Selmer for 
 1989 – Julian Garner for 
 1990 – Edvard Rønning for 
 1991 – Marit Tusvik for  
 1992 – Bjørg Vik for 
 1993 – Norvald Tveit for overall dramatic contributions   
 1994 – Eva Sevaldson for 
 1995 – Terje Nordby for  
 1996 – Jon Fosse for Namnet
 1997 – Jesper Halle for 
 1998 – Petter S. Rosenlund for 
 2000 – Tor Åge Bringsværd for overall dramatic contributions
 2001 – Nina Valsø for 
 2002 – Niels Fredrik Dahl for 
 2003 – Wetle Holtan for 
 2004 – Per HV Schreiner for 
 2005 – Maria Tryti Vennerød for 
 2006 – Liv Heløe og Finn Iunker 
 2007 – Christopher Grøndahl for Tundra and for Silent Winds of Blackpool
 2008 – Edvard Hoem for 
 2009 – Christopher Nielsen for 
 2010 – Kate Pendry for 
 2011 – Lennart Lidström for 
 2012 - Fredrik Brattberg for 
 2014 - Johan Harstad for Osv.
 2015 - Cecilie Løveid for 
 2016 - Mette Edvardsen for We to be
2017 – Tore Vagn Lid, Cecilie Løveid and Nordahl Grieg for 
2018 – Malmfrid Hovsveen Hallum for 
2019 – Demian Vitanza for 
2020 – Lisa Charlotte Baudouin Lie for

See also
 International Ibsen Award

References

External links
International Ibsen Conference website

Norwegian literary awards
Skien
Awards established in 1986
Henrik Ibsen

el:Διεθνές βραβείο Ίψεν